CMOS is a complementary metal–oxide–semiconductor, a class of integrated circuits.

CMOS may also refer to:

Technology
 Nonvolatile BIOS memory, in a personal computer, historically known as CMOS with a CMOS battery
 CMOS sensor, an active pixel sensor in a digital camera
 Credence Systems (former NASDAQ symbol CMOS), a former semiconductor equipment manufacturer

Other uses
 Canadian Meteorological and Oceanographic Society, a Canadian society dedicated to atmospheric and oceanic sciences
 The Chicago Manual of Style
 CMOs, or occasionally, CMOSContract manufacturing organizations, company with customizable outsourced manufacturing capabilities

See also
 CMO (disambiguation)